The Ferenc Puskás Stadium, or formerly People's Stadium (Népstadion) was a multi-purpose stadium in the 14th district (Zugló) of Budapest, Hungary. It was situated between the Puskás Ferenc Stadion and the Keleti pályaudvar metro stations. It was used mainly for football matches. The stadium, which was an all-seater, in the 2000s had a safe capacity of 38,652, though its original capacity exceeded 100,000. The stadium was closed in 2016 and demolished in 2017 to give place to the Puskás Aréna.

History

The first plan of a national stadium were drafted as early as 1896 when there were chances that Budapest would host the first modern Olympic Games.

In 1911 Budapest was one of the frontrunners to host the 1920 Olympics.  However, after Austria-Hungary's defeat in World War I, the Games were awarded to Antwerp instead.

The location of the first plan included Budapest XI. district and Budapest X. district.

In 1924 the government imposed a sport tax which was supposed to be use for the construction of a new national stadium, but finally this money was not used for the construction.

The stadium was built between 1948 and 1953 using a large number of volunteers, including soldiers. It opened in 1953 as Népstadion''' ("People's Stadium").  Less than one year later, on 23 May 1954, the English football team suffered its worst ever defeat here (7–1).

On 14 August 2002 Zalaegerszegi TE moved their UEFA Champions League qualifying match first leg from their home ground to this stadium in order to host Manchester United in order to accommodate a 40,000 crowd. They were rewarded with Zalaegerszeg scoring their most famous European victory, winning 1–0 with Béla Koplárovics becoming the hero with a 92nd-minute winner. Zalaegerszegi lost the return leg at Old Trafford 0–5 and went out of the competition 1–5 on aggregate.

In 2002, the stadium was renamed in honour of Ferenc Puskás, widely regarded as the best striker in the world in his time and Hungary's greatest footballer ever, who was the star of the national team during its glory years of the late 1940s and early 1950s.

Milestone matches

Famous performances

Queen performed at the stadium during their Magic Tour on 27 July 1986 in front of a crowd in excess of 80,000 people, some who had travelled from Poland and USSR. Another 45,000 ticketless fans heard the show over the loudspeakers outside the stadium. The concert was filmed and released worldwide as Hungarian Rhapsody: Queen Live in Budapest. This was one of the last performances by Queen with Freddie Mercury.

In 1988, the stadium hosted the only stop in a communist country of the Human Rights Now! tour, with the artists Hobo Blues Band, Tracy Chapman, Youssou N'Dour, Peter Gabriel, Sting and Bruce Springsteen & The E Street Band. 81 000 people attended.

Monsters of Rock (including AC/DC, Metallica, Mötley Crüe & Queensrÿche) took place at the stadium in 1991.

U2 performed at the stadium on 23 July 1993 during their ZooTV Tour, in front of a crowd of 60,000 people.

Here was Michael Jackson's HIStory Tour second performance on 10 September 1996, for a total audience of 65,000.

The stadium hosted the 1998 European Athletics Championships.

The stadium doubled for Munich's famous Olympic Stadium in Steven Spielberg's 2005 film Munich (see List of films shot in Budapest).

Lord of the Dance creator, Michael Flatley performed his latest dance show, Celtic Tiger Live in the stadium on 9 July 2005. The concert was performed first time for the public. The rehearsals were also done here. The show was filmed for DVD and some scenes of the show, most notably the opening sequence, were placed on the DVD which also has scenes of the performance in the NIA of Birmingham, England. The scenes of the rehearsals were placed on the DVD as part of the Bonus features.

Depeche Mode performed at the stadium three times: the first one was on 12 June 2006 during their Touring the Angel. The second one was on 23 June 2009 during their Tour of the Universe, in front of a crowd of 34,716 people. The third one was on 21 May 2013 during their Delta Machine Tour, in front of a sold-out crowd of 33,200 people. The 2006 and 2009 shows were recorded for the group's live albums projects Recording the Angel and Recording the Universe'', respectively.

Roger Waters performed The Wall in the stadium on 25 August 2013.

Panorama

Concerts

 1965 – Louis Armstrong
 1986 – Queen 104,000
 1987 – Genesis
 1987 – U2
 1988 – Human Rights concert: Peter Gabriel, Sting, Bruce Springsteen
81 000 (Amnesty magazine)
 1990 – Illés & István, a király 
 1991 – AC/DC, Metallica, Mötley Crüe, Queensrÿche
 1992 – Guns N' Roses
 1993 – U2
 1993 – Jean-Michel Jarre
 1994 – Omega
 1995 – Hungária
 1995 – The Rolling Stones
 1996 – Michael Jackson, Tina Turner
 1999 – Omega, P. Mobil
 2001 – Illés, Metró, Omega 
 2004 – Omega 
 2005 – Neoton Família
 2006 – Depeche Mode
 2006 – Robbie Williams
 2007 – George Michael
 2007 – The Rolling Stones
 2009 – Depeche Mode
 2010 – Metallica
 2013 – Depeche Mode
 2013 – Roger Waters

Tenants

On 14 August 2002, Zalaegerszegi TE hosted Manchester United F.C. in the third round of the 2002–03 UEFA Champions League qualifying rounds because the ZTE Arena did not meet UEFA requirements.

The 2009–10 UEFA Champions League group stage matches of Debreceni VSC were played in the stadium because the Oláh Gábor utcai Stadion did not meet UEFA requirements. The first group stage match was played on 29 September 2009 against Olympique Lyonnais. On 20 October 2009, Debrecen hosted ACF Fiorentina in the second group stage match at home. The last match was played on 24 November 2009 against Liverpool F.C.

In the 2013–14 Nemzeti Bajnokság I season Ferencvárosi TC played their home matches in the stadium while their new home, Groupama Arena was under construction.

References

External links
Puskás Ferenc Stadium at magyarfutball.hu

Sports venues in Budapest
Puskas Ferenc
Hungary
Multi-purpose stadiums in Hungary
Athletics (track and field) venues in Hungary
Sports venues completed in 1953
1953 establishments in Hungary
2011 establishments in Hungary
Sports venues demolished in 2017